Kobo360 is a Lagos based digital logistics company for Africans with the goal of solving lack of access to truck owners for goods to be transported from one place to another. Its targets are eCommerce and SMEs. Kobo360's idea matches cargo owners with truck owners to solve the delay faced in getting goods delivered in time. It is owned by Obi Ozor and Ife Oyedele II.  Kobo360 has an app which enable users to carry out their activities easily.

In 2019, KOBO360 had achieved product-market fit, and the company was rapidly expanding as a result of a $30 million equity and debt investment from Goldman Sachs and other investors. In an interview with TechCrunch, KOBO360 CEO Obi Ozor described the issues that arose as a result of the pandemic and the need to rethink strategy. He also discussed how the company dealt with them, as well as its current state of stable growth and sustainability.

In March 2023, Kobo360 was listed among the "25 Rising African Tech Startups To Watch Out For In 2023" by African Folder.

References 

Logistics companies of Nigeria